Gary Nuttall  is an English musician  and vocalist, best known for his long-time affiliation with Robbie Williams, spanning from 1997 to the present day.

Solo
In 2007, Nuttall released his first solo album, Dated Bedroom Ditties.

Discography

Solo
Dated Bedroom Ditties (2007)

Robbie Williams
Life thru a Lens (1997)
I've Been Expecting You (1998)
The Ego Has Landed (1999)
Sing When You're Winning (2000)
Escapology (2002)
Live at Knebworth (2003)
Greatest Hits (2004)
Intensive Care (2005)
In and Out of Consciousness: Greatest Hits 1990–2010 (2010)
Swings Both Ways (2013)
Under the Radar Volume 1 (2014)
The Heavy Entertainment Show (2016)
Under the Radar Volume 2 (2017)
Under the Radar Volume 3 (2019)

As writer
She Makes Me High (1997)
Get The Joke (1997)
Often (2000)

Appearances in videos
Nuttall appears in the following videos.
South of the Border (1997)
Let Me Entertain You (1998)
Strong (1999)
Dance with the Devil (2000)
Make Me Pure (2005)
Shine My Shoes (2014)
Merry Xmas Everybody (2019)

References

External links
Official Gary Nuttall web site

Year of birth missing (living people)
Living people
20th-century births
20th-century English musicians
21st-century English musicians
English pop guitarists
English male guitarists
English rock guitarists
Musicians from Liverpool
English male singer-songwriters
20th-century British guitarists
21st-century British guitarists
Robbie Williams Band members
20th-century British male musicians
21st-century British male musicians